Hoyte is both a surname and a given name. Notable people with the name include:

Gavin Hoyte (born 1990), Trinidadian (soccer) footballer with Eastleigh
Wendy Hoyte, née Clarke, (born 1957), British sprinter
Hoyte van Hoytema (born 1971), cinematographer
John Hoyte (1835–1913), British/Australian artist
Justin Hoyte (born 1984), (soccer) footballer with Arsenal, Sunderland, Middlesbrough and Millwall
Lenon Hoyte (1905–1999), American doll collector